The Anti-Corruption Commission of Myanmar (abbreviated ACC) is a 15-member body responsible for investigating corruption allegations in Myanmar. It was formed under the 2013 Anti-Corruption Law, which was enacted in September 2013.

History 
The commission was formed on 25 February 2014. Initially, most of the appointed members were former high-ranking military personnel. On 23 November 2017, in accordance with the Section 7 of the Anti-corruption Law, the commission was reformed with 12 commission members by President Htin Kyaw.

List of ACC Chairs

Chairman of ACC was appointed by the President of Myanmar.

 Mya Win (February 2014- November 2017)
 Aung Kyi (November 2017- December 2020)
 Tin Oo (? - August 2022)
 Than Swe (August 2022 to ?)
 Htay Aung (1 February 2023 to present)

Landmark cases

 The Commission filed anti-corruption cases against former Director General of Food and Drug Administration (FDA), Dr. Than Htut regarding corruption in construction projects under Ministry of Health and Sports with sub-standard building quality and abusing his power in the ownership of a house and plot of land valued at over 150 million kyats.
 The Commission filed anti-corruption cases against former Yangon Region advocate general Han Htoo and five other officials regarding receiving bribes to dismiss the charges and release three men suspected of killing comedian Aung Ye Htwe in 2018.   
 The Commission filed anti-corruption cases against former Chief Minister of Tanintharyi Region Lei Lei Maw regarding violation of section 55 of the Anti-Corruption Law in March 2019.

References

Politics of Myanmar
Government agencies of Myanmar
Crime in Myanmar
Anti-corruption agencies
Government agencies established in 2014
2014 establishments in Myanmar